The Duke Kahanamoku Invitational Surfing Championship is named in honor of the "Father of Modern Surfing", Duke Paoa Kahinu Mokoe Hulikohola Kahanamoku.  The contest began in 1965 by invitation only at Sunset Beach on the North Shore of Oahu until it was replaced by the Billabong Pro in 1985.  The championship was the first surfing event to be broadcast on a regular basis by ABC's Wide World of Sports.

Two dozen of the best surfers in the world attended the first championship with big-wave surfers like Greg Noll and Fred Hemmings as competitors.  Surfer Jeff Hakman was only seventeen when he claimed his first title.  Noll's streamlined, Semigun surfboard design became the board of choice for contestants riding the Sunset Beach waves, with Ricky Grigg riding a Semigun to victory.  Duke Kahanamoku handed out golden "Duke" statues to the winners for the first three years before he died on January 22, 1968.

The first native Hawaiian to win the championship was Clyde Aikau, in 1973, followed in 1977 by his older brother, Eddie Aikau.

Winners. 1960
Awards from 1965 to 1984:

1965 Jeff Hakman
1966 Ricky Grigg
1967 Jock Sutherland
1968 Mike Doyle
1969 Joey Cabell
1970 Jeff Hakman
1971 Jeff Hakman
1972 James Jones
1973 Clyde Aikau
1974 Larry Bertleman

1975 Ian Cairns
1976 James Jones
1977 Eddie Aikau
1978 Michael Ho
1979 Mark Richards
1980 Mark Warren
1981 Michael Ho
1982 Ken Bradshaw
1983 Dane Kealoha
1984 Derek Ho

References

External links
www.hawaiianswimboat.com
www.surfline.com

Surfing competitions in Hawaii
Recurring sporting events established in 1965
Recurring events disestablished in 1985
1965 establishments in Hawaii
1985 disestablishments in Hawaii